Crnčić is a surname. Notable people with the surname include:

 John Crncich (1925–2019), Canadian American football player
 Leon Črnčič (born 1990), Slovenian footballer
 Menci Clement Crnčić (1865–1930), Croatian painter

Croatian surnames